Therese M. Terlaje (born 1964) is an Guamanian politician and attorney serving as a member of the Legislature of Guam. Terlaje was elected to the Legislature in 2016 and assumed office in 2017.

Early life and education 
Terlaje was born in Yona, Guam. Terlaje's father was Eduardo Salas Terlaje, a politician. Terlaje's mother was Shirley Ann Coulter Terlaje (1938–2019), a former educator. Terlaje attended the Academy of Our Lady of Guam.  Terlaje later earned a Bachelor of Science degree in biology from Creighton University and a Juris Doctor from the UCLA School of Law.

Career 
After graduating from law school, Terlaje became an attorney. She was also an assistant professor at the University of Guam. 

Terlaje was elected to the Guam Legislature in 2016 and assumed office in 2017. In the Legislature, Terlaje is the chair of the Committee on Health, Tourism, Historic Preservation, Land and Justice. She previously served as the chair of the Committee on Culture and Justice. During the 34th legislative session, Terlaje served as vice speaker.

Personal life 
Terlaje has three daughters: Maria, Rita and Arisa Barcinas.

References

External links 
 Therese Terlaje at ballotpedia.org
 Therese M. Terlaje at ourcampaigns.com

|-

1964 births
Creighton University alumni
Guamanian Democrats
Guamanian lawyers
Living people
Members of the Legislature of Guam
People from Yona, Guam
UCLA School of Law alumni